David Blair is a motion picture artist, currently working with electricity. His first feature, the 1991 cult hit Wax or the Discovery of Television Among the Bees, was a funded with public arts grants, and a co-production with ZDF, German Television. After European broadcast, a 16mm print opened theatrically to excellent reviews at the Public Theater in New York, and then copies of that print played cinemas in 26 U.S. cities, further copying themselves for later theatrical play in Japan and Australia. Blair performs in the film. On May 23rd, 1993, a VHS copy of Wax or the Discovery of Television Among the Bees was the first film streamed across the Internet, with the New York Times declaring it a “historic event."

References

External links 
Wax or the Discovery of Television Among the Bees, feature film
Waxweb, web version of Wax or the Discovery of Television Among the Bees
The First Movie On The Internet, Volumes A-G, feature film series
Documentation of The Telepathic Place: Installations of the Telepathic Motion Picture of THE LOST TRIBES

Year of birth missing (living people)
Living people
American video artists